Darüşşafaka High School  is a school in Maslak, Istanbul, Turkey. The school was founded by the Darüşşafaka Association with the name "Darüşşafakar’ül İslamiye" in 1873. This date is disputed, with some sources claiming it was 1872. However, there is a consensus that the school started formal education in 1873 in the Fatih district of Istanbul, on the street named after the school, Darüşşafaka Caddesi, and gained its first graduates in 1881. The school moved to its current location in 1994. However, the street still holds the name of Darüşşafaka as the side street in front of the school's gate, Darüşşafaka Ön Sokak (Darüşşafaka Front Street in Turkish) also does.

External links

Official website

High schools in Istanbul
Educational institutions established in 1873
1873 establishments in the Ottoman Empire
Sarıyer